Alf Tootill (12 November 1908 – 31 August 1975) was an English footballer who played as a goalkeeper. During his career he played for Accrington Stanley, Wolverhampton Wanderers, Fulham and Crystal Palace. His career at Crystal Palace was interrupted by the Second World War.

Tootill retired from football in 1944 at the age of 36, although he did make a guest appearance for Ipswich Town during the 1945–46 season. He died in 1975, aged 66.

References

1908 births
1975 deaths
People from Ramsbottom
English footballers
Fulham F.C. players
Crystal Palace F.C. players
Wolverhampton Wanderers F.C. players
Accrington Stanley F.C. players
English Football League players
Association football goalkeepers